Roller Coaster (Vietnamese: Tàu Lượn Siêu Tốc) is a steel roller coaster located at Suoi Tien Amusement Park in Ho Chi Minh City, Vietnam. The coaster has a rectangular track layout, covering a pond known as Đại Cung Lạc Cảnh Hồ.

Ride experience 
The ride starts with a lift hill. Unlike the traditional chain lift, the Roller Coaster's lift hill use drive tires, which many coasters use to roll into a train station. At the end of the lift, riders face a swooping banked curve, leading to a camelback hill, then a highly banked curve to the right. Another hill appears, followed by a large turn, leading riders to a cave in middle of the air. Trains then bank for the last time and hit the brakes. A small curve leads riders to the station.

Rank 
The Suoi Tien Roller Coaster is currently one of the most popular roller coasters in Vietnam.

External links 
Roller Coaster at RCDB
Suoi Tien Park Official Page

Roller coasters introduced in 2000
Roller coasters in Vietnam
2000 establishments in Vietnam